Crosswicks  or Crosswick may refer to:

In New Jersey
Crosswicks, New Jersey, an unincorporated area within Chesterfield Township in Burlington County
Crosswicks Creek, a tributary of the Delaware River in Burlington, Mercer and Monmouth counties
Elsewhere
Crosswick, Ohio, an unincorporated place in central Wayne Township, Warren County